Chuck Belin (born Charles Edward Belin; October 27, 1970) is a former guard in the National Football League (NFL). Belin was drafted in the fifth round of the 1993 NFL Draft by the Los Angeles Rams and was a member of the team that season, but did not see any playing time during a regular season game. He played with the team for three more seasons. During that time the team moved from Los Angeles to St. Louis, Missouri.

References

Players of American football from Milwaukee
Los Angeles Rams players
St. Louis Rams players
American football offensive guards
Wisconsin Badgers football players
1970 births
Living people